Ulukale is a village in the Çemişgezek District, Tunceli Province, Turkey. The village is populated by Turks and had a population of 325 in 2021.

The hamlets of Aşağıbayır, Cevizlidere, Çaybağı, Yukarıbayır (Yukarıpeydere) and Yünlü are attached to the village. Yukarıbayır is populated by Kurds of the Qoçan tribe.

References 

Villages in Çemişgezek District